Thierry Stevaux (born 14 June 1956) is a former professional tennis player from Belgium.

Career
Stevaux played Davis Cup tennis for Belgium from 1977 to 1982. He appeared in a total of eight ties and finished with a 6/10 overall record, winning four of his 10 singles rubbers and two of his six doubles matches.

The Belgian took part in the 1980 French Open and was beaten in the opening round by Marko Ostoja, in four sets. Stevaux played men's doubles at the French Open three times, with Alain Brichant in 1981 and Wayne Hampson in 1982 and 1983. He lost in the first round each time.

Stevaux, partnering Steve Krulevitz, won the doubles title at the Brussels Outdoor Grand Prix tournament in 1980.

Grand Prix career finals

Doubles: 1 (1–0)

Challenger titles

Doubles: (1)

References

1956 births
Living people
Belgian male tennis players
20th-century Belgian people